Kantan Chamorrita is an ancient style of improvised rhyming "debate" indigenous to the Chamoru natives of the Mariana Islands, comparable to modern-day "battle rapping" or poetry slams.

See also

Music of Guam

External links
ChamorroWeb.com
Kantan Chamorrita at Guampedia.com

References

Chamorro
Poetic forms
Ethnopoetics
Folk poetry